The West Side Tennis Club is a private tennis club located in Forest Hills, a neighborhood in the New York City borough of Queens. The club has 38 tennis courts in all four surfaces (clay court, Har-Tru, grass court and hardcourt), a junior Olympic-size swimming pool and other amenities. It is the home of the Forest Hills Stadium, a 14,000 seat outdoor tennis stadium and concert venue.

The club hosted 60 editions of the U.S. National Championships (renamed the US Open Tennis Championships in 1968), first from 1915 to 1920, and then again from 1924 to 1977. In addition, the finals of the Davis Cup were held at the club 10 times, more than any other venue. The US Pro tournament was held at the venue 11 times, and another prominent professional tournament, the Tournament of Champions, was held at the venue 3 times. The West Side Tennis Club was the venue of the Forest Hills Tennis Classic, a now-defunct WTA Tour Tier IV event, and a men's challenger event. The Open saw some of its biggest moments and changes while at West Side, including the introduction of seedings in 1927, tiebreakers in 1970, equal prize money for men and women in 1973, and night play in 1975. Currently, the stadium is used as an outdoor concert venue.

History

The club was founded in 1892 when 13 original members rented land on Central Park West for three clay courts and a small clubhouse. Ten years later, the land had become too valuable, and the club moved to a site near Columbia University with room for eight courts. In 1908, the club moved again to a property at 238th Street and Broadway. The new site covered two city blocks and had 12 grass courts and 15 clay courts.

The club hosted the International Lawn Tennis Challenge (now known as the Davis Cup) in 1911. With crowds in the thousands, the club leadership realized that it would need to expand to a more permanent location. In 1912, a site in Forest Hills, Queens, was purchased. The signature Tudor-style clubhouse was built the next year.

In 1915, the United States Lawn Tennis Association National Championship, later renamed the U.S. Open, moved to West Side. By 1923, the success of the event necessitated the construction of a 14,000-seat horseshoe-shaped stadium that still stands today. The stadium's first event was the final of the International Lawn Tennis Challenge, which saw the U.S. defeat Australia.

Beginning in 1971, the stadium was home to the annual Robert F. Kennedy Memorial Tennis Tournament which was a celebrity pro-am for charity featuring the likes of Chevy Chase, Arnold Schwarzenegger, Carlos Santana, Edward M. Kennedy, Elton John and more throughout the decade.

In 1975, the tournament was switched to Har-Tru clay courts. By 1978, the tournament had outgrown West Side, and the USTA moved the tournament to the new USTA National Tennis Center in Flushing Meadows under USTA President William Hester's leadership. In 2008, the stadium was the site of a women's satellite tournament.

The New York Empire of World TeamTennis announced it would play its home matches, coached by Patrick McEnroe, at the stadium beginning with its inaugural 2016 season. The team relocated to the USTA Billie Jean King National Tennis Center for its second season in 2017.

Forest Hills Stadium

In addition to hosting the main court for tennis championships, the Forest Hills Stadium has been used as a concert venue featuring major artists ranging from The Beatles, Bob Dylan, Frank Sinatra, The Supremes, Judy Garland, Jimi Hendrix, The Who, Donna Summer, Brand New, Arctic Monkeys, and Chance the Rapper. From 1961 to 1971, the stadium was also the location for the Forest Hills Music Festival.

Following the 1978 departure of the Open the stadium fell into such disrepair that by 2011 it was called a "crumbling ruin" and was denied landmark status by the New York City Landmarks Preservation Commission. The West Side Tennis Club received an offer in 2010 to raze the stadium and replace it with condominiums.

However, in mid-2013, the stadium re-opened as an outdoor concert venue with Mumford & Sons performing the inaugural concert. Since then the Forest Hills Stadium has held a regular summer concert series featuring Santana, Zac Brown Band, D'Angelo, Van Morrison, Arctic Monkeys, and others. It is also the summer home of The New York Pops.

From 2013 to 2017, an extensive four-year renovation to revitalize the historic venue included several significant upgrades. Starting with patching up concrete exterior walls, old seats were removed and replaced by initially 1,200 new seats in 2014. A permanent stage was installed, designed by Mark Fisher, renowned for his sets for Pink Floyd, U2 and the Rolling Stones. A new concourse redesign expanded it to twice its original size for attendees to relax on a grassy court as well as easier access to food and beverages concessions. In addition to reserved seating in the club and bowl were improved seating options for people with disabilities. And after 70 years the central tennis courts were replaced with a standing room general admission floor to accommodate many thousands more people. And unique VIP party lounges were created from unused spaces discovered beneath the stadium after removal of decades-worth of rubble and debris. Plans announced in 2018 to turn the stadium into a year-round venue as a winter village with an ice skating rink have yet to be realized as of 2022.

The stadium also has a history of use as a filming location. The Alfred Hitchcock film Strangers on a Train (1951) was filmed in part during the 1950 Davis Cup finals at the West Side Tennis Club on August 25–27, 1950. Several scenes in Wes Anderson's The Royal Tenenbaums were filmed in and around the stadium, including the "Windswept Fields" meltdown of Richie Tenenbaum.

References

External links
West Side Tennis Club official website
Forest Hills Stadium official website

Forest Hills, Queens
Music venues in New York City
Sports venues in Queens, New York
Tennis venues in New York City
US Open (tennis)
Wightman Cup
1923 International Lawn Tennis Challenge
1947 Davis Cup
1948 Davis Cup
1949 Davis Cup
1950 Davis Cup
1955 Davis Cup
1959 Davis Cup
Tennis clubs